Osanica may refer to:

Places
Osanica, village in the municipality of Goražde, Bosnia and Herzegovina
Osanica, village in the municipality of Žagubica, Serbia